Leptobrachella baluensis (Kamborangah Borneo frog or Kinabalu dwarf litter frog) is a species of amphibian in the family Megophryidae. It is endemic to montane northern Borneo in Sabah and Sarawak (Malaysia) and northern Kalimantan (Indonesia). It has been in synonymy with Leptobrachella mjobergi, but is now treated as a valid species.

Description
They are grey above with dark markings with light-colored borders. Supratympanic fold is black, forming a sharp border towards the dorsum. There is no webbing in the feet. Males have a very loud, high-pitched buzzing call.

Tadpoles are very slender with long tails and move in a characteristic, undulating fashion.

Habitat and conservation
Its natural habitats are sub-montane forests (oak-chestnut and mossy forests) at elevations of  asl (range 900–2200 m is given for Sabah and Sarawak). Tadpoles develop in streams with coarse gravel beds, hiding in the interstitial space.

Leptobrachella baluensis is threatened by habitat loss, but it occurs in several protected areas.

References

External links
 Sound recordings of Leptobrachella baluensis at BioAcoustica

Baluensis
Endemic fauna of Borneo
Amphibians of Indonesia
Amphibians of Malaysia
Amphibians described in 1931
Taxa named by Malcolm Arthur Smith
Taxonomy articles created by Polbot
Amphibians of Borneo